The Shizuoka Open was a professional golf tournament that was held in Japan. Founded in 1972, it was an event on the Japan Golf Tour from 1974. It was last played in 2002 having been dropped from the 2003 tour schedule for economic reasons. It was played over the Hamaoka Course at Shizuoka Country Club near Omaezaki in Shizuoka Prefecture.

Winners

Source:

Notes

References

External links
Coverage on Japan Golf Tour's official site

Former Japan Golf Tour events
Defunct golf tournaments in Japan
Sport in Shizuoka Prefecture
Recurring sporting events established in 1972
Recurring sporting events disestablished in 2002